Juan Manuel Marital (born 25 May 1993) is an Argentine footballer.

He professionally debuted with Godoy Cruz, then Argentine Primera División member.

References
 
 

1993 births
Living people
Argentine footballers
Argentine expatriate footballers
Godoy Cruz Antonio Tomba footballers
Lota Schwager footballers
Primera B de Chile players
Expatriate footballers in Chile
Association football defenders
Sportspeople from Mendoza, Argentina